"Asylum" is a single by The Orb from their 1997 album Orblivion. The single was released in two discs and featured remixes from artists including Thomas Fehlmann and Andrew Weatherall.

External links

The Orb songs
1997 singles
1997 songs
Island Records singles